The discography for the American singer Etta James consists of 29 studio albums, 3 live albums, and 12 compilations. She has also issued 58 singles, one of which, "The Wallflower (Dance with Me, Henry)," reached number 1 on the Rhythm and Blues Records chart in 1955.

As a teenager in San Francisco, California in the early 1950s, James formed a singing trio, which attracted the attention of Johnny Otis, who helped her sign a recording contract with Modern Records in 1954. She recorded "The Wallflower (Dance with Me, Henry)", an answer song to the Midnighters's "Work with Me, Annie", with her vocal group, the Peaches, singing background vocals, which topped the R&B charts for four weeks in 1955. The Peaches eventually left the label, and James recorded as a solo act. She had a second Top 10 hit, "Good Rockin' Daddy", in 1955. She recorded for Modern until the end of the decade, without much further success.

After beginning to date Harvey Fuqua, a singer for the Moonglows, James signed with Argo Records, a subsidiary of Chess Records. Producer Leonard Chess believed James had crossover potential in the pop market and backed her material with orchestral arrangements. With this new style, many of James's songs became hits on both the R&B and the pop charts, such as "All I Could Do Was Cry, "At Last," and "Trust in Me." She released her debut album, At Last!, in 1960. It was followed by The Second Time Around in 1961. In 1967, James recorded with a more soul-inflected style and had her first Top 10 hit in three years, "Tell Mama," which was followed by an album of the same name. In the 1970s, her popularity declined on radio, but remained under Chess records, recording five albums for the label, departing from them with 1975's Etta Is Betta Than Evvah.

After battling drug and alcohol addictions, James returned with her first studio album in nine years in 1989 titled, Seven Year Itch on Island Records. Her two albums in the early 90s for Island and later Elektra, varied in style from contemporary to Soul, but James eventually settled in on the Private Music label. Recording a total of ten albums for the label between 1997 and 2002, her albums included variations of contemporary blues to traditional Jazz, such as her 1997 tribute album to Billie Holiday titled, Mystery Lady: Songs of Billie Holiday. In 2004, she signed with RCA Victor and released Blues to the Bone that same year, followed by a Pop standards release, All the Way, in 2006.

Albums

Studio albums

Live albums

Compilation albums

Singles

Collaborations with Sugar Pie DeSanto

B-sides 

A^ Also peaked at No. 16 on the Hot Adult Contemporary Tracks chart.
B^ Released outside of the United States.

Other appearances

References

Discography
Rhythm and blues discographies
Blues discographies
Discographies of American artists
Soul music discographies